Concordia (minor planet designation: 58 Concordia) is a fairly large main-belt asteroid that is orbiting the Sun with a period of 4.44 years, a semimajor axis of , and a low eccentricity of 0.043. It is classified as a C-type asteroid, meaning that its surface is very dark and it is likely carbonaceous in composition. The surface spectra displays indications of hydrated minerals created through aqueous alteration. It belongs to the Hungaria family of asteroids and has a satellite with an orbital period of 14.29 h.

Concordia was discovered by German astronomer Robert Luther on March 24, 1860. At Luther's request, it was named by Carl Christian Bruhns of the University of Leipzig after Concordia, the Roman goddess of harmony.

References

External links
 
 

Nemesis asteroids
Concordia
Concordia
C-type asteroids (Tholen)
Ch-type asteroids (SMASS)
18600324